Kharestan-e Sofla (also Romanized as Khārestān-e Soflá; also known as Khārestān-e Pā’īn) is a village in Dezhkord Rural District, Sedeh District, Eqlid County, Fars Province, Iran. At the 2006 census, its population was 257, in 59 families.

References 

Populated places in Eqlid County